Schinderhannes is the nickname of German outlaw Johannes Bückler (c.1778–1803).

Schinderhannes may also refer to:

 Schinderhannes (band), a Bavarian rock band
 Schinderhannes (card game), a German card game
 Schinderhannes (play), a 1927 play by Carl Zuckmayer
 The Prince of Rogues, a 1928 German film based on the play
 Schinderhannes bartelsi, an extinct species of arthropod